Coleophora eupreta is a moth of the family Coleophoridae. It is found in France, Spain, Portugal, Italy and North Macedonia.

The larvae feed on Helianthemum apenninum, Helianthemum canum, Helianthemum guttatum, Helianthemum lavandulifolium, Helianthemum nummularium and Helianthemum sessiliflorum. They create a brown leaf case of 7–8 mm. The case is covered by dense wool and has a mouth angle of about 35°.

References

eupreta
Moths described in 1907
Moths of Europe